Ruan Nortjé (born 25 July 1998) is a South African rugby union player for the  in the United Rugby Championship,  in the Currie Cup and the  in the Rugby Challenge. His regular position is lock.

Rugby career

Nortjé grew up in Pretoria and represented his local  at the Under-18 Academy Week in 2016. He joined the Blue Bulls academy after school, and played for their Under-19 team in 2017.

In 2018, Nortjé was included in the South Africa Under-20 squad for the 2018 World Rugby Under 20 Championship. He played in all three of their matches during the pool stage – a 33–27 victory over Georgia, a 30–17 win over Ireland and a 29–46 defeat to France. South Africa qualified for the semi-finals as the runner-up with the best record, but fell short in the semifinal against England, losing 31–32, with Nortjé scoring one of South Africa's tries. He scored another try in their third-place play-off against New Zealand, helping his side to a 40–30 win.

Honours
 Super Rugby Unlocked winner 2020
 Currie Cup winner 2020–21, 2021
 Pro14 Rainbow Cup runner-up 2021
 United Rugby Championship runner-up 2021–22
 United Rugby Championship Ironman award for 2021–22 season
 Selected in the United Rugby Championship "Dream Team" for the 2021–22 season.
 Bulls URC Player of the Year 2022

References

External links
 

South African rugby union players
Living people
1998 births
Rugby union locks
Blue Bulls players
Bulls (rugby union) players
South Africa Under-20 international rugby union players
Rugby union players from Pretoria
South Africa international rugby union players